(For this the Son of God appeared), 40, is a church cantata by Johann Sebastian Bach. He composed it in 1723, his first year in Leipzig, for the Second Day of Christmas, and first performed it on 26 December that year in both main churches, Thomaskirche and Nikolaikirche. It was the first Christmas cantata Bach composed for Leipzig.

The theme of the work is Jesus as the conqueror of the works of the devil, who is frequently mentioned as the serpent. The music is festively scored, using two horns, similar to Part IV of Bach's later Christmas Oratorio. The text by an unknown poet is organised in eight movements, beginning with a choral movement on the biblical text, followed by a sequence of recitatives and arias which is structured as three stanzas from three different hymns. Only two of these hymns are Christmas carols.

Bach used the opening chorus for the concluding  in his 1738 Missa in F major, BWV 233.

History 
Bach composed the cantata in his first year in Leipzig, for the Second Day of Christmas. On this day Leipzig celebrated Christmas and St. Stephen's Day in alternating years, with different readings. In 1723, St. Stephen's Day was remembered, with the prescribed readings for the feast day from the Acts of the Apostles, the Martyrdom of Stephen, and from the Gospel of Matthew, Jerusalem killing her prophets. The cantata text by an unknown author is not related to the martyrdom, but generally reflects Jesus as the conqueror of sin and the works of the devil. The text quotes the Bible in movement 1, a verse from the First Epistle of John. The contemporary poetry alludes to the Bible several times. Movement 2 is based on the Gospel of John. Movement 5 reflects the creation narrative; the image of the serpent is also used in movements 4 and 6. Movement 7 finally picks up a line from the day's Gospel, verse 37, "how often would I have gathered thy children together, even as a hen gathereth her chickens under her wings".

No fewer than three chorale stanzas from three different hymns are part of the structure: movement 3 is stanza 3 from Kaspar Füger's "" (1592); movement 6 is stanza 2 from Paul Gerhardt's "Schwing dich auf zu deinem Gott" (1648); and the closing chorale is the fourth (final) stanza from Christian Keymann's "" (1646). This is unusual; many of Bach's cantatas include only one chorale stanza for a conclusion, and the cantata performed a day before, an early work composed in Weimar, contained no chorale at all. He used the structuring of major works in scenes which are closed by chorale later in his Passions and in his Christmas Oratorio. In this cantata, the first insertion is from a hymn that Bach would later use at the end of Part III of his Christmas Oratorio, sung to the earlier melody (1589) by an anonymous composer. The second insertion is not from a Christmas hymn, but its addressing the "alte Schlange" (old serpent) matches the context. It is sung to a melody possibly composed by Friedrich Funcke. The closing chorale is sung to a melody by Andreas Hammerschmidt, published in his collection  (Fourth part of musical meditations) in Freiberg, Saxony (1646).

The cantata was the first Christmas cantata composed for Leipzig. Bach first performed it on 26 December 1723, and once more, in either 1746 or 1747. For the Christmas season of 1723, from the First Day of Christmas to Epiphany, Bach had performed a program of six cantatas, five of them new compositions, and two major other choral works:

 25 December
 Main service:  and a new Sanctus in D major, BWV 238
 vespers service, BWV 63 and the Magnificat in E-flat major, BWV 243a
 26 December: this cantata
 27 December: 
 1 January: 
 2 January: 
 6 January: 

The cantatas were performed twice on the principal feast days, in the main service, alternating in one of the two major churches of Leipzig Thomaskirche and Nikolaikirche, and in the vespers service in the other.

Bach parodied the first movement of this cantata for the  fugue in his 1738 Missa in F major, BWV 233.

Scoring and structure 
For the festive occasion, the cantata is scored for three vocal soloists—alto, tenor and bass—a four-part choir, two horns (corno da caccia), two oboes, two violins, viola and basso continuo. Bach later used a similar scoring in Part IV of his Christmas Oratorio, to be performed on New Year's Day.

The cantata consists of eight movements:

Music 
According to musicologist Julian Mincham, the cantata has three sections, each concluded by a chorale:
 Chorus, recitative, chorale – "Christ's purpose in a world of sin"
 Aria, recitative, chorale – "Christ's actions in dispelling Satan"
 Aria, chorale – "consequential Christian delight"

Bach used material from the chorales in his own composition, for example deriving the first horn motif from the beginning of the chorale tune of the first chorale. This suggests that he had chosen the structure before he began the composition.

The opening chorus in F major is a setting of the short text "." (For this the Son of God appeared, that he might destroy the works of the Devil.) Klaus Hofmann notes: "This work of destruction is portrayed in the chorus by repeated percussive notes and extended coloratura, but all these illustrative elements are subordinated to a festive Christmas spirit". The horns open the ritornello with a short signal-like motif that is picked up by the oboes and the strings. The movement resembles a prelude and fugue, because the text is first presented in homophony to a repeat of the beginning of the ritornello, then repeated as a fugue, and finally repeated in madrigal style similar to the first section.

John Eliot Gardiner, who conducted this and other Christmas cantatas during the Bach Cantata Pilgrimage with the Monteverdi Choir in 2000, compares the movement's style to the stilo concitato (excited style) of Claudio Monteverdi and notes its "vigorous endorsement to the military campaign against sin and the devil instituted with Jesus' birth". The text speaking of the "works of the devil" is rendered on repeated notes both in the prelude section as in the fugue section; the destruction is pictured in a twisted, almost snake-like, coloraturas in both sections, but the text "" is graced by a new calm theme that is introduced by the tenor, followed by bass, soprano and alto, only accompanied by the continuo. Then the theme contrasts with the two other elements depicting the works of the devil and destruction; it shines almost throughout the fugue.

The short secco recitative, sung by the tenor, the typical voice for Evangelist narration, delivers the message "Das Wort ward Fleisch und wohnet in der Welt" (The word became flesh and lived in the world). The chorale, set for four parts, returns to the thought of sin, "" (Sin makes suffering). The bass line rises to affirm the last line "" (Who could condemn us as Christians?).

The bass aria "" (Hellish serpent, are you not afraid) is accompanied by oboes and strings. Hofmann describes it as a "wide-ranging, operatic bass solo, triumphant about the 'hellish snake. The accompagnato recitative "" (The serpent that in Paradise) explains that sin has been redeemed. The second chorale "" (Shake your head and say) is also a four-part setting. The vivid bass line illustrates the crushing of the serpent's head.

The tenor aria "" (Christian children, rejoice!) is accompanied by both horns and oboes and stresses the words "" (be glad) by extended coloraturas and "" (terrify) by sudden rests. It reflects the joyful mood of the opening chorus. The cantata is closed by "" (Jesu, take to Yourself Your members), the third four-part chorale, asking Jesus for further support in the new year. For several passages, the bass line is moving to illustrate joy and bliss. The harmonisation begins in F minor, changes several times according to the words and reaches F major on the final word "" (Sun of mercy).

Recordings 
The entries are taken from the listing on the Bach Cantatas Website. Ensemble with period instruments in historically informed performance are marked by green background.

References

Cited sources 
Scores
 
 

Books
 

Online sources

Several databases provide additional information on each  cantata, such as history, scoring, sources for text and music, translations to various languages, discography, discussion, and musical analysis.

The complete recordings of Bach's cantatas are accompanied by liner notes from musicians and musicologists: John Eliot Gardiner commented his Bach Cantata Pilgrimage, Klaus Hofmann wrote for Masaaki Suzuki, and Christoph Wolff for Ton Koopman.

External links 
 Darzu ist erschienen der Sohn Gottes, BWV 40: performance by the Netherlands Bach Society (video and background information)
 
 Luke Dahn: BWV 40.3, BWV 40.6, BWV 40.8 bach-chorales.com

Church cantatas by Johann Sebastian Bach
1723 compositions
Christmas cantatas